The kulshedra or kuçedra is a water, storm, fire and chthonic demon in Albanian mythology and folklore, usually described as a huge multi-headed female serpentine dragon. The kulshedra is believed to spit fire, cause drought, storms, flooding, earthquakes and other natural disasters against mankind. In Albanian mythology she is usually fought and defeated by a drangue, a semi-human winged divine hero and protector of mankind. Heavy thunderstorms are thought to be the result of their battles. 

In northern beliefs, the kulshedra can take possession of the sun and moon. In southern beliefs, she is described as an enormous female serpent who surrounds the world. According to this version, if she were ever to touch her tail with her mouth, she could destroy the whole world. It is said that she requires human sacrifices for accepting to postpone the natural disasters and catastrophes.

According to folk beliefs, the kulshedra's earlier stage is the bolla, which has the appearance of a water and chthonic demonic serpent. The bolla's eyes remain shut for the whole year except on Saint George's Day, when it gazes the world and will devour any human on sight. The bolla will eventually morph into kulshedra if it lives many years without being seen by a human. The bollar and errshaja are considered intermediate forms of this serpent as it goes through a series of metamorphoses. These terms also signify serpents; the term bullar merely being a synonym for bolla in Southern Albania. In some regions the kulshedra is depicted like a female eel, turtle, frog, lizard or salamander.

The kulshedra can also appear in the guise of a woman, who keeps her true nature hidden. As a semi-human divine figure she holds also positive qualities that emerge indirectly from Albanian folk tales, beliefs and rituals. It is said that the village where the kulshedra lives has great prosperity in agriculture and livestock. Indeed she absorbs by her breath foodstuffs from everywhere, and her village thrives, while the affected villages become poor and do not prosper. According to folk beliefs people used to practice sacrifices to her so she could bring them good and stop any harmful action.

Names
The term bolla is etymologically related to Greek Φάλη, Φάλαινα 'monster, whale,' (although the relationship is not certain).

Kulshedra (def. ) or (def. )  derives from the Latin , roughly meaning an " snake".

The term bullar is given as a Southern Albanian variant by some sources.

Origin of the myth
The legendary battle of a heroic deity associated with thunder and weather, like drangue, who fights and slays a huge multi-headed serpent associated with water and storms, like kulshedra, has been preserved from a common motif of Indo-European mythology. Similar characters with different names but same motifs representing the dichotomy of "good and evil" – mainly reflected by the protection of the community from storms – are found also in the folklore of other Balkan peoples.

Bolla
The bolla is said to remain closed-eyed until Saint George's Day, where it peers into the world, and will devour any human that approaches it. It is explained in folklore that Saint George had cursed the beast to be forever blind except on his feast day.

Kulshedra
Kulshedra is generally considered to be a female dragon, like a multi-headed serpent form, but it is known to have pendulous drooping breasts touching the ground, thus some German commentators have stated she might be also regarded as a hag. Kulshedra is furthermore said to be covered in wooly red hair, have a long tail, and have seven to twelve heads. It is also said to spit fire. Kulshedra's milk and urine are both considered poisonous. Kulshedra can also appear in the guise of a human female; its appearance in an ordinary woman's guise known locally for example in Dukagjini, Kosovo. It may also appear in the form of a female lizard, turtle, frog, or salamander.

At the same time, kulshedra is widely considered to be a storm demon<ref name="durham">. doi:10.2307/2843266. </ref> Kulshedra is believed to cause drought and other water-related issues for humanity such as torrents, tempests, water shortages, big storms, flooding, or other natural disasters. Often to placate it, a human sacrifice must be made, as witnessed in the tale of the hero Qerosi ("Scurfhead").

In southern beliefs, she is described as an enormous female serpent who surrounds the world. According to this version, if she were ever to touch her tail with her mouth, she could destroy the whole world. In northern beliefs, the kulshedra can take possession of the sun and moon. To frighten the evil demon, the Albanian tribesmen used to shoot in the sky or provoke great noise with metal objects, even by ringing the church bells.

"The male form, called Kulshedër, acts as a devil".

 Metamorphosis 
According to folk belief, a snake after living a certain number of years will metamorphosize into a bolla and eventually become the monstrous kulshedra. The belief that an ancient snake becomes a dragon is not unique to Albanian culture, and similar beliefs can be found for example in Hungary and Romania, as pointed out by Robert Elsie.

In the Kosova town of Prishtina, the kulshedra begins life as a being invisible to mankind for the first twelve years of its life, after which it turns into a bolla ("a kind of serpent"), and afterwards it sprouts wings, becomes hairy, and begins to combat the drangue (dragúa). But the folklore of Malësia and the Northern Mountain Range in Albania provides a more complex life cycle: when the serpent manages to live fifty years without being noticed by anyone, it becomes a bullar, a reptile that feeds milk to snakes, from which these snake derive their venom. If it lives another fifty years without being seen, it becomes an ershaj which coils around its human victim's neck, punctures his chest and eats the heart. When an ershaj (er̄šaj) lives for another century unseen, it finally becomes a kulshedra.

In Tirana, kulshedra was said to begin life as a being hiding in a dark hole which became a snake after six months; the snake must grow an additional six months before it exhibited the behavior for which it could be properly called a kulshedra. Among the Albanian Kastrati tribe, it was believed that a snake sighted by a wren lost its ability to transform into a kulshedra.

 Battles with Dragùa 

Their prime aim in life is to combat and slay Kulshedras. They thus spend much of their youth exercising and running around, so as to learn how to avoid kulshedra's urine and milk. When they sense a Kulshedra approaching, dragùas "go completely berserk and their souls depart from their bodies in preparation for the coming battle". When a human is attacked the dragùa will "fly to their assistance and slay kulshedra by pelting it with cudgels, ploughs, yokes, lances and stones, and even with uprooted trees and houses. Such attacks are seen by humans as lightning". Heavy thunderstorms are thought to be the result of the battle.

The dragùas, even as infants, use the cradle to shield themselves from kulshedra's attacks, which consist of her urine and poisonous milk from her breasts. They also use this cradle as weapons. 

In the Northern Albania, the two are envisioned as battling perpetually in the bend of the Drani River in the Northern Mountain Range. But some folklore speaks of the dragùa accomplishing kulshedra's destruction by drowning, and in Central Albania, the hero is said to have drowned her, knocking her unconscious by throwing trees and boulders at her, and afterwards drowning her in Shkumbin, a river in central Albania.

Dragùas are not the only beings said to have defeated Kulshedra. There are multiple folktales (see: Folktales and other stories with Kulshedra) in which saints and folktale heroes not identified as dragùa have defeated Kulshedra.

 Folktales and other stories with Bolla/Kulshedra 

Saint George and Saint Elias (originally the Old Testament prophet Elijah) both have stories in which they fight (and defeat) a Bolla/Kulshedra. Saint Elias, in particular, is identified in some regions with the Dragùa and is also a weather god and provides protection against storms and fire.

Some folktales involving the slaying of a Kulshedra include:
 "The Daughter of the Moon and the Sun": the kulshedra is slayed by The Daughter of the Moon and the Sun, whose weapon is a point of light
 "The Twins" (Binoshët): the kulshedra is slain by Zjerma, one of the twins (the other being Handa), whose weapons are silver swords. In a variant, before slaying the kulshedra Zjermi is helped by his blood brother, a drangue called Zef, with the aid of other fellow drangues
 "The three friends and the Earthly Beauty"
 "The three brothers and the three sisters"
 "The Youth and the Maiden with Stars on their Foreheads and Crescents on their Breasts"
 "The girl who became a boy"
 "The Snake and the King's Daughter"
 "The barefaced man and the Pasha's brother"
 "The maiden who was promised to the sun"

 Other mentions of Bolla/Kulshedra 

On the Greek island Poros, once inhabited by a majority of Arvanites, the term Bullar is still used to describe water snakes, and in northern Albania, both Bolla and Bollar are used to describe grass snakes.

In Dungeons & Dragons, it is a level 22 Solo Brute that sometimes forms pacts with other demons or other powerful monsters of chaos and evil.

See also

Albanian folklore
Drangue
Stihi
Ljubi
Djall, a devil-like figure in Albanian folklore
Balaur, a similar figure in Romanian folklore
Lernaean Hydra

Sources
Citations

Bibliography

 . 
 Elsie, Robert (2000), "The Christian Saints of Albania". Balkanistica''. 13: 35–57.
 . 
 
 
 
  
 
 
 

European dragons
Albanian legendary creatures